Scoparia autumna is a moth of the family Crambidae. It is endemic to New Zealand.

Taxonomy
This species was described by Alfred Philpott in 1927. However the placement of this species within the genus Scoparia is in doubt. As a result, this species has also been referred to as Scoparia (s.l.) autumna.

Description
The wingspan is 25–27 mm. The forewings are grey mixed with white and with dark chocolate brown markings. The hindwings are ochreous-grey, tinged with fuscous around the apex and termen. Adults have been recorded on wing in April and May.

References

Moths described in 1927
Moths of New Zealand
Scorparia
Endemic fauna of New Zealand
Endemic moths of New Zealand